Choi Tae-woong (born 9 April 1976) is a South Korean volleyball player. He competed in the men's tournament at the 2000 Summer Olympics.

References

1976 births
Living people
South Korean men's volleyball players
Olympic volleyball players of South Korea
Volleyball players at the 2000 Summer Olympics
Place of birth missing (living people)
Asian Games medalists in volleyball
Asian Games gold medalists for South Korea
Volleyball players at the 2002 Asian Games
Medalists at the 2002 Asian Games
21st-century South Korean people